The 2013–14 Czech Extraliga season is the 21st season of the Czech Extraliga since its creation after the breakup of Czechoslovakia and the Czechoslovak First Ice Hockey League in 1993.

Regular season

Playoffs

Play-in Round
 HC Vítkovice Steel - HC Bílí Tygři Liberec 3:0 (2:0, 3:1, 6:2)
 HC ČSOB Pojišťovna Pardubice - HC Slavia Praha 3:2 (3:0, 3:4, 4:2, 0:1, 6:4)

Play-off final: PSG Zlín - HC Kometa Brno 4:1 (3:0, 3:0, 4:1, 1:3, 5:3). PSG Zlín has won its second league title (after 10 years).

Relegation

References

External links 
 

2013–14 in Czech ice hockey leagues
Czech Extraliga seasons